The 2019 FIM Women's Motocross World Championship was the 15th Women's Motocross World Championship season. Kiara Fontanesi was the defending champion, after taking her sixth title in 2018.

2019 Calendar
A 5-round calendar for the 2019 season was announced on 25 October 2018.

Participants

Riders Championship

Manufacturers Championship

References 

Motocross World Championship seasons
Womens Motocross World Championship